Tibouchina  is a neotropical flowering plant genus in the family Melastomataceae. Species of this genus are subshrubs, shrubs or small trees and typically have purple flowers. They are native to Mexico, the Caribbean, and South America where they are found as far south as northern Argentina. Members of this genus are known as glory bushes, glory trees or princess flowers. The name Tibouchina is adapted from a Guianan indigenous name for a member of this genus. A systematic study in 2013 showed that as then circumscribed the genus was paraphyletic, and in 2019 the genus was split into a more narrowly circumscribed Tibouchina, two re-established genera Pleroma and Chaetogastra, and a new genus, Andesanthus.

Description 
Tibouchina species are subshrubs, shrubs or small trees. Their leaves are opposite, usually with petioles, and often covered with scales. The inflorescence is a panicle or some modification of a panicle with reduced branching. The individual flowers have five free petals, purple or lilac in color; the color does not change as the flowers age. There are ten stamens, either all the same or dimorphic, with five larger and five smaller ones. The connective tissue below the anthers of the stamens is prolonged and modified at the base of the stamens into ventrally bilobed appendages. When mature, the seeds are contained in a dry, semiwoody capsule and are cochleate (spiralled).

Taxonomy 
The genus Tibouchina was established by Aublet in 1775 in his Flora of French Guiana with the description of a single species, T. aspera, which is thus the type species. In 1885, in his treatment for Flora brasiliensis, Alfred Cogniaux used a broad concept of the genus, transferring into it many of the species at that time placed in Chaetogastra, Diplostegium, Lasiandra, Pleroma and Purpurella, among others. This broad concept was generally adopted subsequently, and around 470 taxa were at one time or another assigned to Tibouchina.

Phylogeny
A phylogenetic analysis in 2013 based on molecular data (2 plastid and 1 nuclear regions) determined that the traditional circumscription of Tibouchina was paraphyletic. Four major clades were resolved within the genus which were supported by morphological, molecular and geographic evidence. Based on the traditional code of nomenclature, the clade that the type species falls in retains the name of the genus; therefore, the clade containing Tibouchina aspera remains Tibouchina.

A further molecular phylogenetic study in 2019 used the same molecular markers but included more species. It reached the same conclusion: the original broadly circumscribed Tibouchina consisted of four monophyletic clades. The authors proposed a split into four genera: a more narrowly circumscribed Tibouchina, two re-established genera Pleroma and Chaetogastra, and a new genus, Andesanthus. The relationship between Chaetogastra and the genus Brachyotum differed between a maximum likelihood analysis and a Bayesian inference analysis: the former found Brachyotum embedded within Chaetogastra, the latter found the two to be sisters. The part of their maximum likelihood cladogram which includes former Tibouchina species is as follows, using their genus names and with shading added to show the original broadly circumscribed Tibouchina s.l.:

As re-circumscribed, Tibouchina is monophyletic and contains species belonging to the traditional sections T. section Tibouchina and T. section Barbigerae. Diagnostic characteristics include the presence of scale-like trichomes on the hypanthium and leaves and a long pedoconnective on lilac anthers, and the absence of glandular trichomes. Species are found in savanna habitats.

Species
, Plants of the World Online accepts the following species within Tibouchina:

Tibouchina aegopogon (Naudin) Cogn.
Tibouchina albescens Cogn. ex P.J.F.Guim., A.L.F.Oliveira & R.Romero
Tibouchina alpestris Cogn.
Tibouchina araguaiensis P.J.F.Guim.
Tibouchina aspera Aubl.
Tibouchina barbigera (Naudin) Baill.
Tibouchina bicolor (Naudin) Cogn.
Tibouchina bipenicillata (Naudin) Cogn.
Tibouchina brevisepala Cogn.
Tibouchina bruniana P.J.F.Guim.
Tibouchina caatingae J.G.Freitas
Tibouchina calycina Cogn.
Tibouchina catharinae Pittier
Tibouchina cujabensis Cogn.
Tibouchina dissitiflora Wurdack
Tibouchina duidae Gleason
Tibouchina edmundoi Brade
Tibouchina exasperata (Naudin) Cogn.
Tibouchina fraterna N.E.Br.
Tibouchina huberi Wurdack
Tibouchina itatiaiae Cogn.
Tibouchina johnwurdackiana Todzia
Tibouchina karstenii Cogn.
Tibouchina lithophila Wurdack
Tibouchina llanorum Wurdack
Tibouchina mathaei Cogn.
Tibouchina melastomoides (Naudin) Cogn.
Tibouchina nigricans Cogn. ex P.J.F.Guim., A.L.F.Oliveira & R.Romero
Tibouchina octopetala Cogn.
Tibouchina papyrus (Pohl) Toledo
Tibouchina pogonanthera (Naudin) Cogn.
Tibouchina rosanae P.J.F.Guim. & Woodgyer
Tibouchina sickii Brade
Tibouchina sipapoana Gleason
Tibouchina spruceana Cogn.
Tibouchina steyermarkii Wurdack
Tibouchina striphnocalyx (DC.) Pittier
Tibouchina verticillaris Cogn.
Tibouchina xochiatencana de Santiago

Selected former species
Species placed in Tibouchina in its former broad sense include:

Tibouchina anderssonii Wurdack, synonym of Chaetogastra anderssonii
Tibouchina asperior (Cham.) Cogn., synonym of Pleroma asperius 
Tibouchina campii Wurdack, synonym of Chaetogastra campii
Tibouchina ciliaris (Vent.) Cogn., synonym of Chaetogastra ciliaris
Tibouchina clinopodifolia (DC.) Cogn., synonym of Chaetogastra clinopodifolia
Tibouchina elegans Cogn., synonym of Pleroma elegans
Tibouchina francavillana Cogn., synonym of Pleroma francavillanum
Tibouchina gleasoniana Wurdack, synonym of Andesanthus gleasonianus
Tibouchina granulosa, synonym of Pleroma granulosum
Tibouchina gracilis (Bonpl.) Cogn., synonym of Chaetogastra gracilis
Tibouchina grossa, synonym of Chaetogastra grossa
Tibouchina heteromalla, synonym of Pleroma heteromallum - silver-leaved princess flower
Tibouchina lepidota (Bonpl.) Baill., synonym of Andesanthus lepidotus
Tibouchina mollis (Bonpl.) Bonpl., synonym of Chaetogastra mollis
Tibouchina mutabilis (Vell.) Cogn., synonym of Pleroma mutabile
Tibouchina oroensis Gleason, synonym of Chaetogastra oroensis
Tibouchina pereirae Brade & Markgr., synonym of Pleroma pereirae
Tibouchina pulchra (Cham.) Cogn., synonym of Pleroma raddianum
Tibouchina rufipilis (Schltdl.) Cogn., synonym of Chaetogastra rufipilis
Tibouchina semidecandra, synonym of Pleroma semidecandrum
Tibouchina trichopoda (DC.) Baill., synonym of Pleroma trichopodum
Tibouchina urvilleana, synonym of Pleroma urvilleanum  - princess flower, glory bush
Tibouchina versicolor (Lindl.) Cogn., synonym of Chaetogastra versicolor

Distribution and invasive potential 
All the species of Tibouchina are native to the Americas as far north as Mexico south to northern Argentina, with many found in Brazil, and others in Belize, Bolivia, Brazil, Colombia, Costa Rica, French Guiana, Guyana, Honduras, Nicaragua, Panama, Peru, Suriname, and Venezuela. Members of Tibouchina tend to be found in lowland savannas and on the lower slopes of the Andes. All Tibouchina species as well as those formerly placed in the genus are considered noxious weeds in Hawaii, because of their high potential for being invasive species. Many species, such as T. araguaiensis, T. papyrus, T. mathaei and T. nigricans, have narrow distributions, being known from only a handful of locations, while a few other species, including T. aspera, T. barbigera and T. bipenicillata, have broader distributions.

References

External links

GRIN-Global Web v 1.9.7.1: Species of Tibouchina 
Flora Brasiliensis: Tibouchina—
Angiosperm Phylogeny Website (MOBOT) - Myrtales

 
Flora of Central America
Flora of the Caribbean
Flora of South America
Flora of Brazil
Melastomataceae genera